The Intelligent Ground Vehicle Competition (IGVC) is an annual international robotics competition for teams of undergraduate and graduate students. Teams design and build an autonomous ground vehicle capable of completing several difficult challenges. The competition is well suited to senior design “capstone” courses as well as extracurricular design projects.

The competition has taken place each year since 1993. The competition is normally held on the campus of Oakland University in Rochester, Michigan, although it has occasionally moved to other venues within the state of Michigan. Approximately 40 teams typically participate in this competition.

Competition Overview
The details of the competition change from year to year. In 2010 the competition included the following four events.

 Design Competition: The design competition includes a written design report, an oral presentation, and an examination of the vehicle.
 Autonomous Challenge: The autonomous challenge is the major event. Qualification for this event is required. A fully autonomous ground vehicle must navigate an outdoor obstacle course. The course consists of a lane painted with white or yellow lines on a grassy field. Obstacles come in a wide variety of shapes and colors including barrels, cones, saw horses, and posts. The vehicles often use a camera to detect the boundary lines and a laser rangefinder to detect obstacles, although a variety of other approaches have been used.
 Navigation Challenge: This event requires the vehicle to travel autonomously from a specified starting point to a sequence of destinations specified by latitude and longitude. Qualification for this event is also required. Various obstacles are placed around the course including a fence with a randomly relocated opening.
 JAUS Challenge: The JAUS challenge is optional. This challenge requires a vehicle to demonstrate compatibility with the JAUS (Joint Architecture for Unmanned Systems) standard by receiving and responding to a specified list of JAUS commands from the judges.

The competition is often sponsored by the United States Army Tank Automotive Research, Development and Engineering Center (TARDEC) and the Association for Unmanned Vehicle Systems International (AUVSI) in addition to other sponsors.

References

3. Theisen, Bernard L., Maslach, Dan., "The Twelfth Annual Intelligent Ground Vehicle Competition: Team Approaches to Intelligent Vehicles", Proceedings Vol. 5608, Intelligent Robots and Computer Vision XXII: Algorithms, Techniques, and Active Vision, 25 October 2004.

Robotics competitions
Recurring events established in 1993